Abul Kalam Faezul Huq (A. K. Faezul Huq) (15 March 1945 – 19 July 2007) was a Bangladeshi politician, lawyer, and columnist. Huq served as a member of parliament on three occasions, and held various ministerial portfolios including Public Works, Urban Development, Jute, and Textiles after Bangladesh gained independence. He was first elected as a member of the  Pakistan National Assembly from the Banaripara Upazila-Swarupkathi-Nazirpur Upazila constituency as a Awami League nomination in 1970.

On 19 July 2007, Faezul Huq died of a heart attack at his residence in Baridhara, Dhaka. His body was buried at Banani graveyard, Dhaka on 20 July 2007.

Early life
Born in Calcutta, Faezul was the only son of A. K. Fazlul Huq, then Prime Minister of an undivided Bengal. He attended St. Gregory's High School, Dhaka Notre Dame College and by 1967 had obtained degrees in political science and English from Dhaka University. Later Faezul completed his Law degree at the Dhaka University and Central Law College.

Career 
In August 1969, Faezul Huq was invited to join the Department of Political Science at the Notre Dame College, Dhaka as a lecturer.  Huq later left the teaching profession and entered full-time politics in March 1970. He was elected as one of the youngest members of the then Pakistan National Assembly.

Faezul was kept in confinement, along with his wife Rukhsana Huq, in July 1971 during the Bangladesh Liberation War, at Faisalabad (in then West Pakistan), and at gunpoint forced to sign a blank piece of paper by the Pakistani forces which would be later used against him in allegations that he had made pro-West Pakistan statements during the War. Faezul, along with his wife, who was pregnant at the time, were released shortly afterwards.

In the later years, Faezul tried but ultimately failed to clear his name from the allegations against him: that he had purportedly made pro-West Pakistani statements during the ongoing Liberation War at the time.  These allegations would be later repeatedly mentioned by his Bangladeshi political rivals and journalists, so much so, it went into print, which adversely affected Faezul's political career throughout the later years of his life.

After the Liberation War, he was accused of allegedly having close ties with the then West Pakistan because he had Pakistani relatives from his maternal side and because of his alleged pro-Pakistani written statement.  As a result, he was arrested on 17 December 1971 and imprisoned until September 1972 under the Collaborators Act, 1972.

Faezul was released after a formal appeal from his wife, Rukhsana Huq, with the assistance of Rafiqullah Chaudhury, Secretary to the then Prime Minister Sheikh Mujibur Rahman.  The appeal was addressed to Sheikh Mujibur Rahman for his consent.

After his release, Faezul stayed away from politics until 1978, when he sought election to the Parliament.  He was elected as a MP in 1979. He was made a member of the envoy's pool in 1980, and a Director of Bangladesh Krishi Bank in 1981. He was appointed a Minister of State in charge of Public Works in early 1982, and remained in office until Martial Law was declared in March 1982.

From 1982 until 1994 he focused his efforts on social work and sports. He was an active member of the Lions Club in Bangladesh for 30 years.

In 1994, he became involved in politics again, and was elected in the 1996 June election. He was appointed Minister of State in charge of the Ministry of Jute and Textiles.

In his final years, Faezul Huq appeared on numerous current affairs television programs. Faezul also worked as a freelance journalist, writing for newspapers and periodicals including New Age, Holiday, Dhaka Courier, Financial Express, Prothom Alo. He was associated with a number of social and sports organizations, including Red Crescent Society, Asiatic Society of Bangladesh, Cancer Society, Gregorian Association, Bangladesh - China Friendship Society, Bangladesh Shooting Federation, Lions Club of Bangladesh, Dhaka Club, Anjuman Mufidul Islam and Brothers Union Club. Since 2007, St. Gregory's High School has awarded an A. K. Faezul Huq Scholarship.

Personal life

Faezul Huq married Marium Begum Mary in 1966, which was short-lived ultimately resulting in a divorce. Together they had two children: A. K. Faiyazul Huq (Raju) and Farahnaz Huq Chowdhury (Reepa).

After divorcing Marium Begum Mary, Faezul Huq married Rukhsana Huq in mid-1969 and together they had five children: A. K. Ferzul Huq (Faisal), Fersamin Huq Iqbal (Flora), Fahsina Huq (Lira), Fahmina Huq (Shyama), and barrister A. K. Fazlul Huq Jr. (Pikku).

His wife Rukhsana Huq passed away on 24 January 2020 in Dhaka, Bangladesh and was buried at Banani graveyard sharing the same grave of her late husband, A. K. Faezul Huq.

References

1945 births
2007 deaths
Burials at Banani Graveyard
State Ministers of Housing and Public Works (Bangladesh)
State Ministers of Textiles and Jute (Bangladesh)
2nd Jatiya Sangsad members
7th Jatiya Sangsad members
Notre Dame College, Dhaka alumni
Academic staff of Notre Dame College, Dhaka
University of Dhaka alumni
Bangladesh Nationalist Party politicians
Awami League politicians
20th-century Bengalis
People from Bogra District
St. Gregory's High School and College alumni